Parkinson is a surname, and may refer to:

People
Amber Parkinson (born 1976), Australian fencer
Amy Parkinson (1855-1938), Canadian poet
Art Parkinson (born 2001), Irish actor
Bob Parkinson (footballer) (born 1873), English footballer
Cecil Parkinson (1931–2016), Baron Parkinson of Carnforth, British politician
C. Northcote Parkinson (1909–1993), historian and author who formulated Parkinson's Law
Colby Parkinson (born 1999), American football player
Dave Parkinson (1923-1978), Australian rugby league footballer
Don Parkinson (politician), Guamanian politician
Dian Parkinson (born 1944), cast member of the game show The Price is Right
Eugene D. Parkinson (1850-1936), American politician
Frank Parkinson (1887–1946), British industrialist
Georgina Parkinson (1938–2009), English ballet dancer and ballet mistress
Jack Parkinson (footballer born 1869) (1869–1911), English footballer
James Parkinson:
James Parkinson (1755–1824), physician, provided first complete description of Parkinson's disease
James Parkinson (1730–1813), English land agent and museum proprietor
James Parkinson (footballer), English footballer
John Parkinson:
John Parkinson (botanist) (1567–1650), 17th-century English botanist
John Parkinson (physician) (1885-1976), English cardiologist remembered for describing Wolff-Parkinson-White syndrome
John S. Parkinson, American biologist
Katherine Parkinson (born 1978), English actress
Keith Parkinson (1958–2005), American fantasy artist and illustrator
Kenneth Parkinson, member of Watergate Seven
Lucy Jane Parkinson, English actor
Mark Parkinson:
Mark Parkinson (Kansas politician) (born 1957), Lieutenant Governor of Kansas, Governor of Kansas
Mark Parkinson (Missouri politician) (born 1972), Missouri politician, Member of the Missouri House of Representatives
Matthew Parkinson (born 1972), English cricketer
Sir Michael Parkinson (born 1935), television presenter, famous for his chat show Parkinson
Mike Parkinson (1948–2009), New Zealand All Black
Nick Parkinson (1925–2011), Australian public servant and diplomat
Norman Parkinson (1913–1990), English portrait and fashion photographer
Paul Parkinson (Scouting)
Phil Parkinson (born 1967), English football manager
Richard Parkinson (disambiguation), multiple people
Roy Parkinson (1901–1945), Australian watercolour artist
Sacha Parkinson, British actress
Stephen Parkinson (1823–1889), British mathematician
Susan Parkinson:
Susan Parkinson (1925–2012), English potter
Susan Parkinson (nutritionist) (1920–2012), New Zealand nutritionist working in the South Pacific 
Sydney Parkinson (1745–71), Scottish natural history artist

Fictional characters
Pansy Parkinson, fictional character in Harry Potter franchise

English-language surnames
Surnames from given names